The Technet are a fictional group of interdimensional travelling bounty hunters appearing in British and American comic books published by Marvel Comics. The characters appeared mostly in the pages of Captain Britain and Excalibur.

The Technet is a team of bounty hunters, founded and originally led by a villain called Gatecrasher, from various other dimensional worlds. For a price they will hunt down and capture fugitive sentient beings, rescue prisoners from captivity, or track down and retrieve lost objects of value. The Technet range through time, space, and various dimensions in their operations.

Members
The members of the Technet have included:

Gatecrasher, the leader of the Technet. She is a tall, massive, blue-skinned female. Her powers include telepathy, the limits of which have not been established, skills in biogenic nucleotronic splicing, and she is endowed with a lot of physical strength due to her size and build, although in hand-to-hand combat it is apparent she lacks skill and training.
Bodybag is an enormous reptilian biped, who sprays victims with a green narcotic ooze before swallowing them, paralyzed and unconscious, into one of his three back-sacs, where they are kept paralyzed. If the cocoon is broken open, the victim will soon regain his or her ability to think, access to his or her memory, and control over his or her voluntary muscles.
China Doll has a humanoid body above the waist and a serpentine one beneath, and can shrink other beings to trinket-size with her touch.
Elmo is a deceased pink-skinned, non-humanoid alien with immense eyes and tentacles who can "dampen" the energy level of other beings. He looks a lot like the later member Waxworks.
Ferro was a four-armed biped with fur who was a master swordsman, and wielded swords with all four of his arms.  Was slain by Warwolves, apparently after his warranty expired.
Ferro2 was the identical brother of Ferro, and replaced him in the team when the former was killed by Mojo's Warwolves.  Seems to be the most intelligent of the group aside from Gatecrasher.
Hard-Boiled Henry was created by Gatecrasher as a weapon. He resembles Tweety Bird, but has a timer on his forehead. When it counts down, Henry self-destructs with the force of a bomb. He destroyed himself on his first mission, but he reappeared with the Technet in Fantastic Four.
Joyboy resembles a grotesquely large-headed and fat humanoid baby, floating around in a levitating, cybernetic egg-cradle. Joyboy can telepathically detect a person's greatest desire and use psionic powers to fulfill a distorted version of the wish, such as when Shadowcat was unable to phase back to being solid, and Joyboy helped her, but she also became obese. If Joyboy loses consciousness, his transformations of others are immediately undone.
Numbers is a large, bug-eyed, reptilian biped; an accountant and negotiator for the team.  Though physically formidable and imposing, Numbers displayed no combat skills as a member of the Technet and is generally averse to fighting. As a member of the Special Executive, however, he did help combat the Fury, firing an energy beam at it from either side of his head.
 Pandora, a large fungus that can quickly cover and consume all organic material in the vicinity. Pandora stays contained within a small sphere and is used only as a last resort. She doesn't seem to have any intelligence and is a biological weapon.
Ringtoss can emit rings composed of an unknown form of energy from her head to entrap an opponent. The rings cease to exist when Ringtoss loses consciousness. Ringtoss and Waxworks seemed to have a relationship with each other as they were often seen in each other's company and often seen embracing one another.
Scatterbrain, also known as Fascination, is a yellow-skinned, green-haired female humanoid alien who is apparently incapable of speech and who feeds on the excess emotional energy of sentient beings. Scatterbrain can render a victim temporarily helpless by firing all of the victim's neural synapses at once. Scatterbrain can fly and can also apparently teleport herself.
Thug is a short, squat and green biped with unusual strength for his size and two opposing thumbs on each hand. He can draw future and past versions of himself to the present to help him in battle, but his limited intelligence also means he often quarrels with his other selves. Brother of Legion of the Special Executive (who was killed by the Fury).
Waxworks  a blobbish, jellyfish like, non-humanoid alien from the same species as deceased member Elmo, but has the power to "soften" its opponents—to the point where their bodies stretch and distort out of control—with a touch.
Yap (whom Gatecrasher often disparagingly calls "Bonebag"), Gatecrasher's constant companion. He is a small, sentient being who can teleport himself and his companions across vast distances. Yap can detect the psychic auras of individuals and the electron patterns created by such things as Captain Britain's battlesuit. By these means Yap can track down specific individuals. Yap has telepathic powers whose limits are undefined. Yap has an intense emotional dependency on Gatecrasher and refers to her as "mother," usually to Gatecrasher's annoyance.

History
In the Technet's first recorded exploit, they were hired by Opul Lun Sat-Yr-9, the other dimensional counterpart of Opal Luna Saturnyne on an alternate Earth (Earth-794), to hunt down and bring back Byron Bra-Dhok, alias Kaptain Briton, the evil, other dimensional counterpart to Earth-616's Captain Britain. Kaptain Briton fled to Captain Britain's Earth, fought Captain Britain and switched costumes with him, thereby deceiving the pursuing Technet, who then mistakenly took Captain Britain prisoner. The Technet brought Captain Britain to Sat-Yr-9's Earth. There Captain Britain convinced the Technet that he was not the man they had been hired to capture, and the Technet joined Captain Britain in battling the angry Sat-Yr-9's troops. Captain Britain returned to his own Earth, where his sister, Psylocke had killed Kaptain Briton when he attempted to assault her.

Later, the Technet traveled on business to the Wereworlds, whose natives become werewolves under a full moon, having been exiled from their home by Sat-Yr-9. Here Elmo, a member of the Technet, was fatally wounded by werewolves. Subsequently, Gatecrasher either seriously injured or killed a member of the 'Berserker Pirates' who attempted to interest her in becoming his lover. The pirate's family forced the Technet to turn over all their accumulated wealth as reparations. Angered by this reversal in their fortunes, all of the members of the Technet except for Yap and Fascination left the team.

Gatecrasher then went to a celebration held by the despot of Kandahar. A person she believed to be the despot himself hired her to procure a perfect mathematical model of the universe that was made of rock crystal and that was held and revered by the Incas of 14th century Peru on Earth-616. Gatecrasher, Yap, and Fascination journeyed through time to obtain the model, but Gatecrasher and Yap were tricked by the person they believed to be a native high priest into consuming fruit filled with the eggs of deadly parasites. Gatecrasher and Yap were thus forced to remain under a cooling waterfall to prevent the eggs inside them from hatching and consuming their bodies from within. In actuality, an alien had impersonated both the despot of Kandahar and the high priest, and hoped to force Fascination into his employ through this convoluted plot. This alien had already succeeded in hiring the members of the Technet who had just left the group. His team was the Special Executive, a future version of the Technet. The team's precognitive told him that Fascination wouldn't join the Special Executive for another 300 years.

Fascination brought Captain Britain and his companion Meggan to 14th century Peru to rescue Gatecrasher. Captain Britain gathered together the plants necessary to create the antidote that would kill the parasite eggs. Gatecrasher and Yap consumed the antidote, and then they, Fascination, Captain Britain, and Meggan returned to their own time period.

Gatecrasher recruited new members Numbers and Waxworks into the Technet, and all of the former members excepting the slain Elmo rejoined. At some point during this period, Fascination changed her name to Scatterbrain.

Opal Luna Saturnyne hired the Technet to capture Rachel Summers, alias Phoenix, whom Saturnyne claimed was a threat to the universe. At this time, Rachel was on the run from Mojo, who had enslaved her to star in his movies. Mojo sent his servants, the Warwolves, after Rachel. The Warwolves and the Technet fought over Rachel and during the fight, Ferro was killed. Rachel was saved by Captain Britain, Meggan, and her fellow X-Men Nightcrawler and Shadowcat. Together they fought off the Technet, with Gatecrasher fleeing for her life, who then retreated. This battle against the Technet led directly to the formation of the team Excalibur by Summers and her allies. It was later revealed that Saturnyne had hired the Technet under orders of Roma, who needed to form the superhero team to save the multiverse.

The Technet were allowed to stay in Brighton, England, where they would use their alien technology to provide the city with sunny weather. Meanwhile, they would plot to capture Rachel Summers and regain their honor. During this time, they were hired by Sat-Yr-9, who had taken the identity of Courtney Ross. The Technet were hired to free Jamie Braddock. They succeeded in their task, but Jamie was taken by Ross and the Technet's memories of their mission were wiped. Gatecrasher then constructed Hardboiled Henry, a living bomb, to ambush Excalibur. The plan succeeded and the Technet nearly defeated Excalibur, but agents of Saturnyne interfered. The Technet received a holographic message from Saturnyne, telling them that they were permanently exiled to Earth-616 and that the bounty on Phoenix was cancelled. Furious, the Technet turned on Gatecrasher, but Gatecrasher and Yap teleported away. The Technet begged Excalibur for asylum and Nightcrawler told his teammates to accept. The former Technet repaired the damage done by Hardboiled Henry to Excalibur's home. During these repairs, Numbers met the dragon living in Excalibur's basement and fell in love with her. The British government came to Excalibur's home for help against an invisible, murderous creature, but only Nightcrawler was home, nursing a broken leg. Nightcrawler trained the aliens to become the N-Men and they managed to destroy the creature, but Joyboy disappeared during this mission. Shortly afterwards the Special Executive appeared on Earth and told the N-Men that they had predicted Earth's destruction to happen within the next few hours. They offered the N-Men a job. The N-Men agreed and teleported away, together with Numbers, the dragon and their newly born children.

Excalibur managed to prevent Earth's destruction and found Joyboy with the Crazy Gang. Here Joyboy had formed a psychic bond with the Crazy Gang's Red Queen, using his powers to distort her nightmares and form a beautiful land. During this time, Gatecrasher began to go insane, seeing images of Hardboiled Henry, who accused her of making his death meaningless.

Later, Technet, the Crazy Gang and Feron, a misguided ally of Excalibur, all meet in chaos during the pre-wedding preparations for Brian and Meggan's wedding. It is resolved peacefully and everyone is allowed to attend the wedding itself.

The Technet later reappeared in the pages of Fantastic Four #6. In this appearance, Gatecrasher was the leader once more and Joyboy and Hardboiled Henry had returned as well. Roma had hired the Technet to capture Franklin Richards to investigate his incredible powers. The Fantastic Four and Roma came to an understanding and the Technet disappeared.

The Technet helped Rocket Raccoon with a heist during a period when he was separated from the Guardians of the Galaxy.

Special Executive
At some point in the future, the amalgamated group would come to be known as the Special Executive and travel back to the past where they would again encounter and oppose Captain Britain and Meggan earlier in the continuity.

Though the Special Executive is a future version of the Technet, it appeared first in comics. Due to time-travel, the Special Executive has interacted with its previous incarnation at several points.

In other media

The Technet appears briefly in a cameo in the X-Men animated series of the 1990s. They appear in episode #49 "Proteus: Part 1", as background characters in a bar in Scotland, visited by Moira McTaggert's son, Kevin.

Notes

References

Technet at the International Heroes Catalogue

Comics characters introduced in 1985
Marvel UK teams
Characters created by Alan Davis